The Hundred Schools of Thought were philosophies and schools that flourished from the 6th century BC to 221 BC during the Spring and Autumn period and the Warring States period of ancient China.

An era of substantial discrimination in China, it was fraught with chaos and bloody battles, but it was also known as the Golden Age of Chinese philosophy because a broad range of thoughts and ideas were developed and discussed freely. This phenomenon has been called the Contention of a Hundred Schools of Thought (百家爭鳴/百家争鸣; bǎijiā zhēngmíng; pai-chia cheng-ming; "hundred schools contend"). 

The thoughts and ideas discussed and refined during this period have profoundly influenced lifestyles and social consciousness up to the present day in East Asian countries and the East Asian diaspora around the world. The intellectual society of this era was characterized by itinerant scholars, who were often employed by various state rulers as advisers on the methods of government, war, and diplomacy.

This period ended with the rise of the imperial Qin dynasty and the subsequent purge of dissent.

Schools listed in the Shiji
A traditional source for this period is the Shiji, or Records of the Grand Historian by Sima Qian. The autobiographical section of the Shiji, the "Taishigong Zixu" (太史公自序), refers to the schools of thought described below.

Confucianism

Confucianism (儒家; Rújiā; Ju-chia; "School of scholars") is the body of thought that arguably had the most enduring effects on Chinese life. Its written legacy lies in the Confucian Classics, which later became the foundation of traditional society.  Confucius (551–479 BC), or Kongzi ("Master Kong"), looked back to the early days of the Zhou dynasty for an ideal socio-political order. 

He believed that the only effective system of government necessitated prescribed relationships for each individual: "Let the ruler be a ruler and the subject a subject".  He contended that a king must be virtuous in order to rule the state properly. To Confucius, the functions of government and social stratification were facts of life to be sustained by ethical values. His ideal human was the junzi, which is translated as "gentleman" or "superior person".

Mencius (371–289 BC), or Mengzi, formulated his teachings directly in response to Confucius.

The effect of the combined work of Confucius, the codifier and interpreter of a system of relationships based on ethical behavior, and Mencius, the synthesizer and developer of applied Confucianist thought, was to provide traditional Chinese society with a comprehensive framework by which to order virtually every aspect of life.

There were many accretions to the body of Confucian thought, both immediately and over the millennia, from within and without the Confucian school. Interpretations adapted to contemporary society allowed for flexibility within Confucianism, while the fundamental system of modeled behavior from ancient texts formed its philosophical core.

Diametrically opposed to Mencius, in regards to human nature (性), was the interpretation of Xunzi (c. 300–237 BC), another Confucian follower. Xunzi preached that man is not innately good; he asserted that goodness is attainable only through training one's desires and conduct.

Legalism

The School of Law or Legalism (法家; Fǎjiā; Fa-chia; "School of law") doctrine was formulated by Li Kui, Shang Yang (d. 338 BC), Han Fei (d. 233 BC), and Li Si (d. 208 BC), who maintained that human nature was incorrigibly selfish; accordingly, the only way to preserve the social order was to impose discipline from above, and to see to a strict enforcement of laws. The Legalists exalted the state above all, seeking its prosperity and martial prowess over the welfare of the common people.

Legalism greatly influenced the philosophical basis for the imperial form of government.  During the Han dynasty, the most practical elements of Confucianism and Legalism were taken to form a sort of synthesis, marking the creation of a new form of government that would remain largely intact until the late 19th century, with continuing influence into the present.

Taoism

Philosophical Taoism or Daoism (道家; Dàojiā; Tao-chia; "School of the Way") developed into the second most significant stream of Chinese thought. Its formulation is often attributed to the legendary sage Laozi ("Old Master") The focus of Taoism is on the individual within the natural realm, rather than the individual within society. Accordingly, the goal of life for each individual is seeking to adjust oneself and adapting to the rhythm of nature (and the Fundamental) world, to follow the Way (tao) of the universe, and to live in harmony. 

In many ways the opposite of Confucian morality, Taoism was for many of its adherents a complement to their ordered daily lives. A scholar serving as an official could usually follow Confucian teachings, but in retirement might seek harmony with nature as a Taoist recluse. Politically, Taoism advocates for rule through inaction, and avoiding excessive interference.

Mohism

Mohism or Moism (墨家; Mòjiā; Mo-chia; "School of Mo") was developed by followers of Mozi (also referred to as Mo Di; 470–c.391 BC). Though the school did not survive through the Qin dynasty, Mohism was seen as a major rival of Confucianism in the period of the Hundred Schools of Thought. Its philosophy rested on the idea of impartial care: Mozi believed that "everyone is equal before heaven", and that people should seek to imitate heaven by engaging in the practice of collective love.

This is often translated and popularized as "universal love", which is misleading as Mozi believed that the essential problem of human ethics was an excess of partiality in compassion, not a deficit in compassion as such. His aim was to re-evaluate behavior, not emotions or attitudes. His epistemology can be regarded as primitive materialist empiricism. He believed that human cognition ought to be based on one's perceptions – one's sensory experiences, such as sight and hearing – instead of imagination or internal logic, elements founded on the human capacity for abstraction.

Mozi advocated frugality, condemning the Confucian emphasis on ritual and music, which he denounced as extravagant. He regarded offensive warfare as wasteful and advocated pacifism or at the most, defensive fortification. The achievement of social goals, according to Mozi, necessitated the unity of thought and action.  His political philosophy bears a resemblance to divine-rule monarchy: the population ought always to obey its leaders, as its leaders ought always to follow the will of heaven. 

Mohism might be argued to have elements of meritocracy: Mozi contended that rulers should appoint officials by virtue of their ability instead of their family connections. Although popular faith in Mohism had declined by the end of the Qin Dynasty, its views are said to be strongly echoed in Legalist thought.

School of Yin-yang

The School of Naturalists or Yin-yang (陰陽家/阴阳家; Yīnyángjiā; Yin-yang-chia; "School of Yin-Yang") was a philosophy that synthesized the concepts of yin-yang and the Five Elements;  Zou Yan is considered the founder of this school. His theory attempted to explain the universe in terms of basic forces in nature: the complementary agents of yin (dark, cold, female, negative) and yang (light, hot, male, positive) and the Five Elements or Five Phases (water, fire, wood, metal, and earth). 

In its early days, this theory was most strongly associated with the states of Yan and Qi. In later periods, these epistemological theories came to hold significance in both philosophy and popular belief.  This school was absorbed into Taoism's alchemic and magical dimensions as well as into the Chinese medical framework. The earliest surviving recordings of this are in the Ma Wang Dui texts and Huangdi Neijing.

School of Names 

The School of Names or Logicians (名家; Míngjiā; Ming-chia; "School of names") grew out of Mohism, with a philosophy that focused on definition and logic. It is said to have parallels with that of the Ancient Greek sophists or dialecticians. The most notable Logician was Gongsun Longzi.

Schools listed in the Hanshu
In addition to the above six major philosophical schools within the Hundred Schools of Thought, the "Yiwenzhi" of the Book of Han adds four more into the Ten Schools (十家; Shijia).

School of Diplomacy

The School of Diplomacy or School of Vertical and Horizontal [Alliances] specialized in diplomatic politics; Zhang Yi and Su Qin were representative thinkers. This school focused on practical matters instead of any moral principle, so it stressed political and diplomatic tactics, and debate and lobbying skill. Scholars from this school were good orators, debaters and tacticians.

Agriculturalism

Agriculturalism was an early agrarian social and political philosophy that advocated peasant utopian communalism and egalitarianism. The philosophy is founded on the notion that human society originates with the development of agriculture, and societies are based upon "people's natural propensity to farm."

The Agriculturalists believed that the ideal government, modeled after the semi-mythical governance of Shennong, is led by a benevolent king, one who works alongside the people in tilling the fields. The Agriculturalist king is not paid by the government through its treasuries; his livelihood is derived from the profits he earns working in the fields, not his leadership.

Unlike the Confucians, the Agriculturalists did not believe in the division of labour, arguing instead that the economic policies of a country need to be based upon an egalitarian self sufficiency. The Agriculturalists supported the fixing of prices, in which all similar goods, regardless of differences in quality and demand, are set at exactly the same, unchanging price.

For example, Mencius once criticized its chief proponent Xu Xing for advocating that rulers should work in the fields with their subjects. One of Xu's students is quoted as having criticized the duke of Teng in a conversation with Mencius by saying:

Syncretism

Syncretism, or the School of Miscellany integrated teachings from different schools; for instance, Lü Buwei found scholars from different schools to write a book called Lüshi Chunqiu cooperatively. This school tried to integrate the merits of various schools and avoid their perceived flaws. The (c. 330 BC) Shizi is the earliest textual example of the Syncretic School.

School of "Minor-talks"
The School of "Minor-talks" was not a unique school of thought. All the thoughts which were discussed by and originated from non-famous people on the street were included in this school. At that time, there were some government officials responsible for collecting ideas from non-famous people on the street, and reporting to their seniors. Such thoughts formed the origin of this school.

Unlisted schools

These schools were not listed in the Hanshu but had substantial influence.

School of the Military
Another group is the School of the Military that often studied and discussed what westerners called the philosophy of war. Some of them studied warfare and  strategy, others focused on kinds and skills of weapons. Sun Tzu and Sun Bin were influential leaders. Some of their famous works are Sun Tzu's The Art of War and Sun Bin's Art of War. Their theories later  influenced China and East Asia more broadly. These classical texts have received great interest among contemporary interpreters, some of whom have applied it to military strategy, the martial arts, and modern business.

Yangism
Yangism was a form of ethical egoism founded by Yang Zhu.  It was once widespread but fell to obscurity before the Han dynasty.  Due to its stress on individualism, it influenced later generations of Taoists.

School of the Medical Skills
School of the Medical Skills is a school which studied medicine and health. Bian Que and Qibo were well-known scholars. Two of the earliest and existing Chinese medical works are Huangdi Neijing and the han dynasty Shanghan Lun.

History and origins
The "Yiwenzhi" of the Hanshu claims that the officials working for the government during the early Zhou Dynasty lost their position when the authority of the Zhou rulers began to break down in the Eastern Zhou period. In this way, the officials spread all over the country and started to teach their own field of knowledge as private teachers. In this way the schools of philosophy were born. 

In particular, the School of Scholars (i.e. the Confucian School) was born from the officials of the Ministry of Education; the Taoists from the historians; the Yin-yang School from the astronomers; the Legalist School from the Ministry of Justice; the School of Names from the Ministry of Rituals; the Mohist School from the Guardians of the Temple; the School of Diplomacy from the Ministry of Embassies; the School of Miscellany from the government counselors; the School of Agriculture from the Ministry of the Soil and Wheat; the School of Minor Talks from the minor officials. Although the details are unclear, the burning of books and burying of scholars during the Qin was the end of the period of open discussion.

It should be stressed that only the Ru, or Confucians and the Mohists were actual organized schools of teachers and disciples during this period.  All the other schools were invented later to describe groups of texts that expressed similar ideas.  There was never an organized group of people describing themselves as "Legalists," for example, and the term "Daoist" was only coined in the Eastern Han after having succeeded the Western Han's Huang-Lao movement though in Mencius it does describe the school of agriculture taking disciples

See also

Axial Age
Hellenistic philosophy
Hundred Flowers Campaign
Jixia Academy

References

External links
Classics of the hundred schools, Chinese Text Project (Chinese and English)
 先秦諸子‧要覽子藉 Many fragmentary and newly discovered texts of the hundred schools of thought.(Chinese)
先秦诸子学基本资料
歷代農家代表人物及著作
《子藏》總序 - 臺北大學中國文學系
05子藏-1155部 
Hundert Schulen
Zhou dynasty literature, thought, and philosophy, ChinaKnowledge
輯佚資料集成目次【子部】
 Mo Zi-Wikisource

Agriculturalism
Chinese philosophy
Confucian schools of thought
Legalism (Chinese philosophy)
Mohism
Taoism
History of Taoism